The Regius Professorship of Humanity, formerly the Regius Professorship of Classics, is a Regius Chair in classics at the University of Aberdeen.

List of Regius Professors of Humanity

 1886–1911: William Mitchell Ramsay
 1911–1937: Alexander Souter
 1938–1952: Peter Noble
 1952–1979: William Smith Watt
 2007–2017: Jane Stevenson
 2020–present: John Behr

References

Humanity
Humanity, Regius, Aberdeen
Humanity, Regius